The 1994 Warringah by-election was held in the Australian electorate of Warringah in New South Wales on 26 March 1994. The by-election was triggered by the resignation of the sitting member, Liberal MP Michael MacKellar on 18 February 1994, from the safe Liberal seat. The writ for the by-election was issued on the same day.

The by-election was won by Liberal candidate Tony Abbott who served as the Prime Minister of Australia from 18 September 2013 to 15 September 2015.

The Warringah by-election was held on the same day as the Mackellar by-election triggered by the resignation of sitting Liberal member Jim Carlton.

During the by-elections in Mackellar and Warringah the maverick far right Labor MP Graeme Campbell (politician) urged electors to vote for Australians Against Further Immigration.

Unsuccessful candidates for Liberal preselection included former NSW attorney-general John Dowd, future MP Peter King, and future senator Concetta Fierravanti-Wells.

Results

See also
 List of Australian federal by-elections

References

1994 elections in Australia
March 1994 events in Australia
New South Wales federal by-elections